Roman Gergel (born 22 February 1988) is a Slovak professional footballer who plays as a forward for Bruk-Bet Termalica Nieciecza.

Club career
Gergel made his Corgoň Liga debut in the 7–1 defeat against MŠK Žilina on 14 July 2007. After his first season he relegated with Trenčín to the Second Division. He scored 10 goals in the 2008–09 season and 3 goals in the 2009–10 season. In September 2010, he signed four-year contract for MŠK Žilina for an undisclosed fee. He played four games for Žilina at the 2010–11 UEFA Champions League group stage.

International career
Gergel was first called up to the senior national team for two unofficial friendly fixtures held in Abu Dhabi, UAE, in January 2017, against Uganda and Sweden. He capped his debut against Uganda, being fielded from the start until the 70th minute, when he was substituted for Miroslav Káčer. Slovakia went on to lose the game 1–3. Gergel also appeared in the second half of the match against Sweden. In the 60th minute he substituted Káčer. Slovakia lost the match 0–6.

Honours

Club
MŠK Žilina
Slovak Superliga: 2011–12
Slovak Cup: 2011–12

Individual
I liga top scorer: 2020–21

References

External links
 
 MŠK Žilina profile
 Corgoň Liga profile
 
 Roman Gergel at Footballdatabase

1988 births
Living people
People from Bánovce nad Bebravou
Sportspeople from the Trenčín Region
Association football wingers
Slovak footballers
Slovak expatriate footballers
AS Trenčín players
MŠK Žilina players
1. FC Tatran Prešov players
FC DAC 1904 Dunajská Streda players
Górnik Zabrze players
Bruk-Bet Termalica Nieciecza players
Slovak Super Liga players
Ekstraklasa players
I liga players
Expatriate footballers in Poland
Slovak expatriate sportspeople in Poland
Slovakia youth international footballers
Slovakia under-21 international footballers